Thyene ornata is a jumping spider species in the genus Thyene. The male was first identified in 2008.

Distribution
Thyene ornata has been found in Ethiopia.

References

Endemic fauna of Ethiopia
Arthropods of Ethiopia
Salticidae
Spiders described in 2008
Spiders of Africa
Taxa named by Wanda Wesołowska